Gibsoniothamnus is a group of plants described as a genus in 1970.

Gibsoniothamnus is native to southern Mexico, Central America, and Colombia.

Species

References

Schlegeliaceae
Lamiales genera